Naftifine hydrochloride (brand names include Exoderil and Naftin) is an allylamine antifungal drug for the topical treatment of tinea pedis, tinea cruris, and tinea corporis (topical fungal infections).

Naftifine was invented at the Sandoz Research Institute in Vienna, Austria.  It was the first successful antifungal medication of the allylamine class.

Naftifine has triple action: antifungal, antibacterial, and anti-inflammatory.  Its fungistatic activity is believed to be based on inhibition of the squalene-2,3-epoxidase enzyme, which in turn results in the shortage of ergosterol required for the formation of fungal cell membranes.  With some fungal species, there is also fungicidal activity from a resulting accumulation of squalenes, leading to damage of the fungal cell membranes, including at the endoplasmatic reticulum.   Naftifine shows mostly fungicidal activity toward dematophytes and molds, and mostly fungistatic activity toward yeasts.  It is also effective as an antibacterial agent in treating pyoderma. 

Naftifine is almost completely metabolized in the human body, with a half-life of 2–3 days.   Its metabolytes do not have antifungal activity, and they are excreted with urine and feces.

References

Alkene derivatives
Antifungals for dermatologic use
1-Naphthyl compounds